Pudsey and Otley was a parliamentary constituency centred on the towns of Pudsey and Otley in West Yorkshire.  It returned one Member of Parliament (MP) to the House of Commons of the Parliament of the United Kingdom, elected by the first past the post system.

History 

The constituency was created for the 1918 general election, partially replacing the previous Pudsey and Otley constituencies.  It was abolished for the 1950 general election, when it was largely replaced by a new Pudsey constituency while Otley became part of Ripon.

Boundaries
The Municipal Borough of Pudsey, the Urban Districts of Burley-in-Wharfedale, Calverley, Farsley, Horsforth, Ilkley, Otley, and Rawdon, and part of the Rural District of Wharfedale.

Members of Parliament

Election results

Elections in the 1910s

Elections in the 1920s

Elections in the 1930s 

General Election 1939–40:

Another General Election was required to take place before the end of 1940. The political parties had been making preparations for an election to take place and by the Autumn of 1939, the following candidates had been selected; 
Conservative: Granville Gibson
Liberal: John Smuts
Labour: M. H. Wigglesworth, replaced by H. N. Penlington

Elections in the 1940s

References

Parliamentary constituencies in Yorkshire and the Humber (historic)
Constituencies of the Parliament of the United Kingdom established in 1918
Constituencies of the Parliament of the United Kingdom disestablished in 1950
Pudsey